Kaliyugaya is a 1981 Sri Lankan drama film directed by Lester James Peries; it was adapted from the novel Kaliyugaya by Martin Wickramasinghe, and follows the events of the film Gamperaliya. It was followed by the film adaptation of the third novel in Wickramasinghe's trilogy, Yuganthaya, in 1983.

It was a Director's Fortnight selection at the 1982 Cannes Film Festival

Synopsis 

Piyal (Henry Jayasena) and Nanda (Punya Heendeniya) from Gamperaliya have now aged, and their children have left them. Priya reminisces on her life after her son sends her a letter from London accusing her and her husband of various faults.****

Production 
The film features the four main actors of Gamperaliya; it was shot on 35mm and used eastmancolor. The film also featured the famous stately home Lakshmigiri.

Cast
 Henry Jayasena as Piyal
 Punya Heendeniya as Nanda
 Wickrama Bogoda as Tissa
 Trilicia Gunawardena as Anula
 Sanath Gunathilake as Alan
 Anoja Weerasinghe as Irene
 Asoka Peiris as Friend
 Tony Ranasinghe as Doctor
 Kamal Addararachchi
 Nawanandana Wijesinghe
 S. A. Jamis
 Tissa Udangamuwa
 Leena de Silva
 A. J. de Soysa
 Lal Peiris
 Sampath Wijesinghe

References

External links
 Sri Lanka Cinema Database
 
 

1981 films
Films directed by Lester James Peries
1981 drama films
Films based on Sri Lankan novels
Films based on works by Martin Wickramasinghe
1982 drama films
1982 films